Bethesda Game Studios Dallas LLC (formerly Escalation Studios, LLC) is an American video game developer based in Dallas, founded in 2007 by Tom Mustaine, Marc Tardif, and Shawn Green. The company was briefly owned by 6waves Lolapps in 2012 and acquired by ZeniMax Media in February 2017. In August 2018, Escalation became part of Bethesda Game Studios under the name Bethesda Game Studios Dallas.

History 
Escalation Studios was formed in 2007, co-founded by Tom Mustaine, Marc Tardif, and Shawn Green. Mustaine had previously co-founded Ritual Entertainment, while Tardif had been an executive producer and senior vice president of business development at Gearbox Software.

On January 18, 2012, social gaming company 6waves Lolapps (6L) announced that it had acquired Escalation to undisclosed terms. As a result of the acquisition, Mustaine and Tardif became Escalation's design directors, while Green became director of engineering for 6L. At the time, Escalation had around 30 employees. However, in March 2012, 6L announced that it had laid off its entire development staff, wherein Escalation would "remain active in some capacity". On May 15, 2012, Escalation announced that it had become independent again.

On February 1, 2017, Escalation Studios was announced to have been acquired by ZeniMax Media, the parent company of game publisher Bethesda Softworks. Subsequently, Escalation became part of Bethesda Game Studios, Bethesda Softworks' development division, under the name Bethesda Game Studios Dallas.

Games developed

Canceled 
 Severity

References 

2007 establishments in Texas
American companies established in 2007
American corporate subsidiaries
Companies based in Dallas
Video game companies based in Texas
Video game companies established in 2007
Video game development companies
ZeniMax Media